Andreas Rauschmeier (born 9 September 1970) is an Austrian former ski jumper.

References

1970 births
Living people
Austrian male ski jumpers
Sportspeople from Salzburg